Snow Camp is an unincorporated community in southern Alamance County, North Carolina, United States, noted for its rich history and as the site of the Snow Camp Outdoor Theater.  The community has a large Quaker population centered on the pre-revolutionary era Cane Creek Friends Meeting. The community was founded by Quaker Simon Dixon circa 1750 after visiting  the area and purchasing 500 acres from the British Government for 252 pence. Through The Earl of Granville, he led a revolt against the British Government because of unfair taxation, not by fighting but by bankrolling the cause. After the Battle of Guilford Court House in Guilford County, North Carolina, General Cornwallis of the British Government won but was injured in the Guilford Court House Battle, led by General Nathanael Greene of the Revolutionaries.  General Cornwallis regrouped in Snow Camp and occupied the Snow Camp community.

History 

The origin of the name of the community is disputed, but the most commonly accepted story as to how the name came about was that before the American Revolution a group of hunters from Pennsylvania camped there during a snowfall. The lesser accepted story is that General Cornwallis camped there during a snowfall around the time of the Battle of Guilford Court House. Geographically, Snow Camp is situated in the piedmont region of the state.

Though quite small, Snow Camp is historically significant. Herman Husband, a leader in the Regulator Movement lived here. The Regulator Movement culminated in the Battle of Alamance prior to the Revolutionary War. During the Revolutionary War, battles were fought nearby at Lindley's Mill, Clapp's Mill, and at Pyle's Defeat. Snow Camp was also a site of early Quaker settlement in North Carolina, as Friends from Pennsylvania migrated to the Cane Creek valley in the mid-1700s and established the Spring Meeting at Snow Camp; several historic buildings clustered around the spring remain from that settlement.

The old Plank Road, a main artery in colonial times, ran through a portion of Snow Camp.

Today Snow Camp remains a small but vibrant community that honors its deep roots to the past.

The Hiram Braxton House, Friends Spring Meeting House, Camilus McBane House, and Snow Camp Mutual Telephone Exchange Building are listed on the National Register of Historic Places.

Notable person
 Joseph M. Dixon, Representative, Senator, and the seventh Governor of Montana

See also 
 Cane Creek Friends Meeting

References

External links
History of Spring Meeting, Snow Camp

Unincorporated communities in Alamance County, North Carolina
Unincorporated communities in North Carolina